Boulder Creek is a small rural mountain community in the coastal Santa Cruz Mountains. It is a census-designated place (CDP) in Santa Cruz County, California, with a population of 5,429 as of the 2020 census. Throughout its history, Boulder Creek has been home to a logging town and a resort community, as well as a counter-culture haven. Today, it is identified as the gateway to Big Basin Redwoods State Park.

History

The Boulder Creek area is in the traditional tribal territory of the Achistaca, an Awaswas speaking people of the Ohlone cultural unit, who were a group of contiguous bands that inhabited the coastal region of present-day California from the San Francisco Bay to the Monterey Peninsula and down to San José and Salinas Valley.

There are no living survivors  of the Achistaca, who are spoken for by the Amah Mutsun Tribal Band. 

According to one anthropologist, the indigenous name for the area was Achista and tentatively included Acsaggi. 

The earliest European presence in the area was a Spanish exploratory party in 1769, led overland from Mexico by Don Gaspar de Portolá and Father Juan Crespí. On August 28, 1791, a Spanish mission, Mission Santa Cruz, was established by the Franciscans from Mission Santa Clara de Asís for the conversion of the Awaswas. The Awaswas were moved to Mission Santa Cruz and Mission San Juan Bautista, which claimed the land and peoples. The Awaswas language and its dialects became the main language spoken at Mission Santa Cruz.

Upon independence from Spain in 1821, the area became a part of Mexico. Although Spain had not awarded land grants in the Santa Cruz area, the Mexican government started issuing them in 1822 when it took over the administration of California. Most of the grants lay along the coast, with the only ones within the San Lorenzo Valley being Rancho Zayante and Rancho San Agustin. Under Mexican administration, only natural citizens could own land. Although not a Mexican citizen, in 1841, Isaac Graham purchased the Rancho Zayante land grant by proxy from frontiersman and naturalized Mexican citizen Joseph Ladd Majors. In 1843, together with Peter Lassen, Graham built one of the first water-powered sawmills in California and, with it, the first significant settlement in the area. Graham's settlement marked the beginning of San Lorenzo Valley's lumber-based economy.

Following the Mexican–American War of 1846–1848 and the California Gold Rush of 1848, the area steadily grew in population, including considerable immigration. While the Treaty of Guadalupe Hidalgo ending the War obliged the United States to honor Mexican land grants, the process took many years of court hearings. In the meantime, squatters and entrepreneurs moved into the valley to harvest its rich resources of timber and lime. Despite the lack of roads, many families braved the wilderness to homestead the upper San Lorenzo. There were few large operations in the upper San Lorenzo Valley, leading the pioneers to develop their own systems of harvesting and transporting to the lumber and tanning markets. Logging in the valley supplied large timbers to shore up the underground workings of the mines after the initial rush of gold-panning gave way to other mining techniques. By the late 1850s, early settlers and lumbermen were using the Turkey Foot floodplain as a gathering point for their mule and oxen teams.

Timber town
Branciford Alcorn was one of the first to settle along Bear Creek in 1865. Daniel Crediford and sons Wilfred and Stephen moved about four miles up Boulder Creek to the Sequoia district in 1867. West Virginian Joseph Wilbur Peery also settled in the Boulder area in 1867 and began a small-scale logging project along the San Lorenzo River. Peery built a dam across the river at Two Bar Creek to provide water power to his mill and for the one he later built two miles south of the junction of the river, Boulder and Bear creeks. Twin brothers Austin and Oscar Harmon assisted at the Two Bar Creek mill until its closure. The erection of the Two Bar Creek sawmill by Peery later helped in the establishment of the settlement of Boulder.

The year 1868 was the founding year for the settlement of Boulder. Transportation remained a problem, slowing development of the small communities that now dotted the valley. A road extension from Graham Hill Road linking the upper San Lorenzo valley with Santa Cruz through Felton was completed in May. It also marked the completion of the United States government's survey of all land not held by grants in the Santa Cruz Mountains, which was then opened for purchase and homesteading. Government surveyors divided the largely unsettled San Lorenzo Valley into claimable sections. The area of Boulder Creek occupied two 160-acre tracts. The northern half, between Harmon and Bear Creeks, was awarded to John Alcorn, Branciford's son. Loggers moved up the San Lorenzo and its tributaries removing every marketable tree that were then sold to the demanding market of the San Francisco Bay area. The lumbermen and their families moved into scattered cottages and homes around the periphery of Peery's Two Bar Creek sawmill, while a general store, livery stable, and blacksmith shop arose nearby to support the mill and its visitors. The increase in the number of families with children determined the need for a school, the first one of which was started in a small building on Alcorn's land on what is now West Park Drive.

Lumber could not be shipped over the mountains to Santa Clara Valley. Two years later in 1871, another road extension, the Saratoga Toll Road, was added from the summit at the Saratoga Gap and ran 11 miles to meet the road that ran about four miles above Boulder Creek. In June, the Maclay Turnpike officially opened. Alcorn erected a two-story boarding house, the Boulder Creek House. That same year, Peery was awarded a land grant and relocated his lumber mill a mile south to Lorenzo, a settlement that he laid out, which was bounded by what is now Harmon, West, South, and East Streets. With an access point to the greater San Francisco Bay Area came the establishment of a post office named Boulder Creek in 1872, with Peery becoming the first Postmaster. Mail runs were limited to twice a week because it took a mail carrier two days to travel from Santa Clara to Felton.

What is now Boulder Creek was originally once two settlements: Lorenzo at the southern end of town, and Boulder was north of the current town core.

Boulder Creek served as the upper terminus of the San Lorenzo Valley Logging Flume terminating in Felton, which began construction in 1874 and, when formally opened in October 1875, was augmented by a new rail line to transport logs to the wharf in Santa Cruz. In the 1880s, this lumber town which was called Lorenzo took the name of the Boulder Creek post office that had been established in the 1870s.

Geography
Boulder Creek is located on the West Coast of the United States. The community is bordered by San Mateo County to the northwest; Santa Clara County to the northeast; Big Basin Redwoods State Park to the west; and Brookdale to the south.

Boulder Creek sits at the north end of the San Lorenzo Valley at the confluence of San Lorenzo River and Boulder Creek within the Santa Cruz Mountains, a Level IV ecoregion designated by the United States Environmental Protection Agency (EPA), an area surrounded by steep, redwood- and pine- covered hills formed by the river, creek, and their tributaries. The river flows through Boulder Creek on the east and south through Brookdale, Ben Lomond, and Felton, and continues south to the City of Santa Cruz where it enters Monterey Bay. Directly across from Boulder Creek's confluence with the San Lorenzo River, Bear Creek flows into the river and creates a topographical feature known as the Turkey Foot. The Turkey Foot creates a floodplain, particularly on the western side of the river where the mountainside is less steep.

Climate

Boulder Creek has a warm-summer Mediterranean climate (Köppen Csb) characteristic of California's coast, with moist, mild winters and dry summers. Located about 15 miles inland, the Boulder Creek skies can be overcast due to moisture from the Pacific Coast marine layer. 

On average, there are 75 rainy days a year, and annual precipitation averages . Above-average rain years are often associated with warm El Niño conditions in the Pacific while dry years often occur in cold water La Niña periods.

Boulder Creek falls under the USDA 9b Plant hardiness zone.

Flooding
Flooding of the San Lorenzo River, caused by a combination of high tide, storm surge, and runoff, has been known to cause extensive damage. A Santa Cruz Surf newspaper article from January 25, 1890 mentioned the San Lorenzo River being at its highest known since 1849 with Boulder Creek having received 90 inches of rainfall up to that date during the 1889-90 winter season. A log jam was reported at the junction of the river and Bear Creek, with Boulder Creek being "higher than ever known". Bear Creek Bridge gave way and a cottage from the tributary Hesse Creek was carried by flood waters down to Boulder Creek, where it was stopped by rescue parties. There was one casualty.  In a April 19th article of the San Francisco Examiner that same year, Boulder Creek held first place in the season's precipitation with 122.11 inches of rain received. 

According to a March 24 article of the Santa Cruz Morning Sentinel, the 1907 flood destroyed and swept away all five bridges within town limits that connected the eastern and western sides of Boulder Creek - Booth, Schroder, Swinging Bridge, Barker, and Grover Dam bridge.

Modern records began in 1937 with the highest river level rise recorded during the December 1955 storm from December 22 to 23. According to the Santa Cruz Sentinel-News, Boulder Creek recorded 32.42 inches of rain during that flood storm. Within the area, Highway 9 in the vicinity of Wildwood Grove had minor undercutting of the road fill and Riverside Grove experienced principal residential damage.

During the January 1982 El Niño storm, from January 3 to 4, 12.74 inches of rainfall occurred in Boulder Creek over the period of 24 hours. This generated debris flows and shallow landslides. During the El Niño winter of 1996 and 1997, higher concentrations of debris flows was observed in the area around Boulder Creek.

Fire
Fires have occurred throughout Boulder Creek's history.

Two conflagration-sized fires nearly destroyed downtown Boulder Creek and the nearby village of Lorenzo on July 17, 1891.

The CZU Lightning Complex fires started on August 16, 2020 due to a severe thunderstorm that initially started several separate fires. Due to a change in wind conditions, these separate fires merged together and rapidly spread through nearby communities, including Boulder Creek. The CZU fire incident was finally contained on September 22, after destroying a number of houses but sparing the town's historic main street.

Cityscape

California State Route 9 enters Boulder Creek from the south at River Street, bisecting the community as the Central Avenue arterial thoroughfare, before passing by Bear Creek Road to the northeast and becoming SR 9 once again. Within the community core, Route 9 connects to the southern terminus of California State Route 236 with an at-grade intersection, which provides access to the northwest of the community as Big Basin Way. Route 236 then continues westward from Boulder Creek and into Big Basin Redwoods State Park. 

The community is divided into three geographical sections of unequal size: Village Core, South Village, and Outlying Village Areas.

Architecture

The architecture of Boulder Creek varies but is generally popular among tourists and locals. Many of the commercial buildings along Central Avenue are designed primarily in the Boomtown style. Historic buildings are designed primarily in the Queen Anne and a variety of Victorian styles. For examples, the designs of the McLeod House and the Stagg/Hartman House are drawn from these architectural movements. Modern and other non-classical architectural styles, such as Minimal Traditional and Ranch, are also seen throughout the community. Outside downtown Boulder Creek, architectural styles are even more varied. The former Grace Episcopal Church is designed in the Gothic Revival style.

Demographics

The 2020 United States census showed Boulder Creek's population to be 5,429, an increase of 10.3% from the 2010 census. 

As of the 2020 census, the racial makeup and population of Boulder Creek included: 4,142 Whites (76.3%),  411 Multiracial Americans (7.6%), 117 Asians (2.2%), 28 African Americans (0.5%), 22 Native Americans and Alaska Natives (0.4%), 12 Native Hawaiians and other Pacific Islanders (0.3%), and 61 persons of other races (1.5%). There were 636 Hispanic or Latinos of any race (15.4%).

2010 Census data
The 2010 United States Census reported that Boulder Creek had a population of 4,923. The racial makeup of Boulder Creek was 4,429 (90.0%) White, 54 (1.1%) African American, 31 (0.6%) Native American, 81 (1.6%) Asian, 5 (0.1%) Pacific Islander, 119 (2.4%) from other races, and 204 (4.1%) from two or more races. Hispanic or Latino of any race were 366 persons (7.4%).

The Census reported that 100% of the population lived in households.

There were 2,124 households, out of which 548 (25.8%) had children under the age of 18 living in them, 997 (46.9%) were opposite-sex married couples living together, 176 (8.3%) had a female householder with no husband present, 97 (4.6%) had a male householder with no wife present.  There were 189 (8.9%) unmarried opposite-sex partnerships, and 29 (1.4%) same-sex married couples or partnerships. 598 households (28.2%) were made up of individuals, and 129 (6.1%) had someone living alone who was 65 years of age or older. The average household size was 2.32.  There were 1,270 families (59.8% of all households); the average family size was 2.80.

The population was spread out, with 884 people (18.0%) under the age of 18, 319 people (6.5%) aged 18 to 24, 1,222 people (24.8%) aged 25 to 44, 2,066 people (42.0%) aged 45 to 64, and 432 people (8.8%) who were 65 years of age or older.  The median age was 45.4 years. For every 100 females, there were 105.2 males.  For every 100 females age 18 and over, there were 104.3 males.

The homeowner vacancy rate was 2.1%; the rental vacancy rate was 6.5%. 74.0% of the population lived in owner-occupied housing units and 26.0% lived in rental housing units.

2000 Census data
As of the census of 2000, there were 4,081 people, 1,630 households, and 1,025 families residing in the CDP. The racial makeup of the CDP was 90.25% White, 0.59% African American, 1.10% Native American, 1.72% Asian, 0.20% Pacific Islander, 2.18% from other races, and 3.97% from two or more races. Hispanic or Latino of any race were 5.68% of the population.

There were 1,630 households, of which 31.8% had children under the age of 18 living with them, 48.1% were married couples living together, 10.1% had a female householder with no husband present, and 37.1% were non-families. 25.6% of all households were made up of individuals, and 4.2% had someone living alone who was 65 years of age or older. The average household size was 2.50 and the average family size was 3.02.

In the CDP, the population was spread out, with 23.6% under the age of 18, 7.9% from 18 to 24, 33.8% from 25 to 44, 28.7% from 45 to 64, and 6.0% who were 65 years of age or older. The median age was 38 years. For every 100 females, there were 101.1 males. For every 100 females age 18 and over, there were 101.6 males.

The median income for a household in the CDP was $60,455, and the median income for a family was $66,037. Males had a median income of $48,125 versus $40,197 for females. The per capita income for the CDP was $32,012. About 1.9% of families and 8.0% of the population were below the poverty line, including 0.9% of those under age 18 and 7.4% of those age 65 or over.

Economy
The area's economy was historically based on the timber and lime industries, but now relies on tourism. As the closest community to Big Basin Redwoods State Park, Boulder Creek provides services to some of Big Basin's visitors. Many of its current residents are retirees, families and professionals who commute to nearby jobs.

Culture

Museums
The San Lorenzo Valley Museum is an educational foundation that maintains two of the area's official museums. The California Humanities and the National Endowment for the Humanities (NEH) partially fund the Museum, and its permanent and temporary exhibits are open to the public free of charge. Its main gallery is in Boulder Creek, which is housed in the former Grace Episcopal Church, a historical landmark listed on the National Register of Historic Places. The other location is the Faye G. Belardi Memorial Gallery in Felton.

Festivals and street fairs
Boulder Creek is home to several different and unique street festivals, parties, and parades. Most famous are its Fourth of July Parade and Lumberjack Days held every July; Halloween Sidewalk Party in October; and Christmas in the Redwoods in November. The Boulder Creek Art, Wine, and Music Festival was previously held every Memorial Day Weekend on Central Avenue for more than 20 years; it has continued as the Santa Cruz Mountain Art and Wine Festival and is held every Labor Day Weekend at Garrahan Park.

Government
Boulder Creek is an unincorporated community, a status it has held since being dis-incorporated during the 1915 session of the California State Legislature. While Boulder Creek is not governed at the municipal level, it does consist of a number of entities to support its needs. Its executive and legislative governing body is the Santa Cruz County Board of Supervisors and in the county-wide elections,  Boulder Creek forms part of District Five. The Board acts in place of a city council. Because of its unincorporated status, Santa Cruz County provides land use planning, parks, public works, and economic development services and regulation. 

In the California State Legislature, Boulder Creek is in the 17th Senate District and previously in the 29th Assembly District. As of the 2022 redistricting, the community now falls under the 28th Assembly District.

In the United States House of Representatives, Boulder Creek was in California's 18th congressional district. As of the 2023 redistricting, the community now falls under the 19th congressional district.

Departments and agencies
Independent and semi-independent entities include the:
 Boulder Creek Business Association
 Boulder Creek Fire Protection District
 Boulder Creek Recreation and Park District

Education
San Lorenzo Valley Unified School District (SLVUD), the sole public school district in the community, operates the comunity's single public elementary school, Boulder Creek Elementary. In the 2021-22 school year, 445 students were enrolled in the public elementary school. From sixth to twelfth grades, Boulder Creek students attend San Lorenzo Valley Middle and High Schools, both located in Felton.

The communitty is also home to three private schools (PK, PK-K, 1-12), one of which is a Montessori Teacher-run pre-school, and one public charter school (K-12). Santa Cruz Public Libraries operates one neighborhood location, the Boulder Creek Branch Library.

Media
KBCZ is a non-profit, community-based radio station broadcasting, since receiving its license in June 2013, from the Boulder Creek Recreation and Park District's Visitor Center office in downtown Boulder Creek. The FCC granted extended coverage in 2021 and KBCZ now covers all of the San Lorenzo Valley, Scotts Valley, Lompico and parts of Santa Cruz.

Notable people
Michael Been - musician; resident
Aric Cushing – actor, director, author
Cora Evans – Catholic mystic; resident
Jonathan Franzen – author; resident for several years
Nick Herbert – physicist and author; resident
Christopher Hills - author; resident
Jordan Hubbard - FreeBSD co-founder; resident
Paul Locatelli - Jesuit priest and academic; born in Boulder Creek
Martan Mann - jazz pianist, educator, author; resident
Tom Pepper – Nullsoft co-founder; resident
Samuel H. Rambo – California State Senator; resident

See also
 Ahlgren Vineyard
 DigiBarn Computer Museum

References

External links
Boulder Creek Business Association
Boulder Creek Fire Protection District
Boulder Creek Recreation and Park District
San Lorenzo Valley Museum 
Big Basin Vineyards
Santa Cruz Mountain Bulletin
Unofficial website – Outdated since 2011.

Census-designated places in Santa Cruz County, California
Census-designated places in California